Etiler Anatolian High School is a high school located in the Etiler neighborhood of Beşiktaş, Istanbul, Turkey.

In the 1961-1962 school year a girls' junior high school, Levent Girls Middle School, was established. In the winter vacation of 1968 the school became a high school moved to a new building, so it became the Levent High School. It was given its current name on 7 January 1981.

References

External links
 Etiler Anadolu Lisesi 

High schools in Istanbul
Anatolian High Schools